Dennis William Lawrence CM (born 1 August 1974) is a Trinidad and Tobago former professional footballer and current first-team coach at Coventry City. He was the manager of the Trinidad and Tobago national team from 2017 to 2019. Prior to coaching, he had a successful playing career in England, Wales and Trinidad and Tobago. He lifted the Caribbean Cup with the Soca Warriors and won several cup competitions with Wrexham before winning a league title with Swansea City. Before moving to Everton, he had coached for three years at Wigan Athletic during which time he became the first Trinidadian to win the FA Cup.

Club career
Prior to becoming a footballer, Lawrence worked as a supermarket attendant in Port of Spain. He later joined the Trinidad and Tobago Defence Force and became eligible to play for their football team Defence Force.

Lawrence signed for Wrexham for a fee of £100,000 in 2001, joining from Defence Force of his native Trinidad, becoming the third Trinidadian at Wrexham along with Hector Sam and Carlos Edwards. Before signing for Wrexham, he had trials at Newcastle United and Bolton Wanderers.

After some poor performances when he first joined the club, Lawrence went on to become a valued and popular player at the Welsh club, winning the 2003–04 Player of the Season award. He has also become the first Wrexham player to play at a World Cup, starting all three of his country's games.

He signed for Swansea City on 16 August 2006 after Swansea had lost central defender and skipper Garry Monk to injury. He made an impressive Swansea debut in a 2–0 win over Doncaster Rovers winning the Man of the Match award.

On 30 September 2008 it was announced he had joined Crewe Alexandra on a 4-month loan until January. On 30 December 2008, the loan was extended until the end of the 2008–09 campaign, but he returned to the Liberty Stadium at the end of his loan spell on 2 May.

Lawrence was released from his contract after two years with Swansea City on 4 May, with his former loan employers Crewe Alexandra interested in a permanent move.

In September 2009 he signed a deal to play for San Juan Jabloteh in his native Trinidad.

On 18 March 2010, Wrexham manager Dean Saunders revealed that Lawrence was training at his former club along with fellow former Swansea player Kristian O'Leary.

International career
Lawrence has been an important player for the Trinidad and Tobago national team, having made his debut on 18 March 2000. He was awarded the MVP (Most Valuable Player) award at the 2001 Caribbean Cup, which Trinidad and Tobago won. On 16 November 2005, he (in his 61st cap) scored the goal against Bahrain that awarded Trinidad and Tobago a ticket to the 2006 World Cup. He played every minute of his country's campaign in Germany as the Soca Warriors secured an impressive 0–0 draw against Sweden and gave England a run for their money.

He is also the player who approached Port Vale's Chris Birchall and asked him if he was interested in representing Trinidad and Tobago (Chris' mother was born there).

After a failed qualifying campaign for the 2010 FIFA World Cup, Lawrence, who had succeeded Dwight Yorke as national captain, announced his retirement from international football with 89 caps under his belt.

Coaching career
Lawrence joined Wigan Athletic as a coach in October 2010 after impressing Spanish manager Roberto Martinez on a trial during the 2010/11 pre-season. When Martinez was appointed as manager of Everton, Lawrence was appointed as first-team development coach.

On 30 January 2017, Lawrence was appointed manager of Trinidad and Tobago.

On 25 June 2021, Lawrence was appointed as Coventry City's new first-team coach. The 46-year-old joined Mark Robins’ coaching team for the start of pre-season training, which began the week after at Ryton.. On 12 March 2022, Mark Robins and his assistant Adi Viveash both tested positive for COVID-19, which left Lawrence in charge of the Sky Blues during their game against Sheffield United, which ended in a 4-1 win.

Personal life
As a member of the Trinidad and Tobago squad that competed at the 2006 FIFA World Cup in Germany, Lawrence was awarded the Chaconia Medal (Gold Class), the second highest state decoration of Trinidad and Tobago.

Career statistics
Scores and results list Trinidad and Tobago's goal tally first, score column indicates score after each Lawrence goal.

Managerial statistics

Honours
Wrexham
FAW Premier Cup: 2000–01, 2002–03, 2003–04
Football League Trophy: 2005
Player of the season: 2003–04

Swansea
Football League One: 2007–08Trinidad and TobagoCaribbean Cup: 2001
Caribbean Cup MVP: 2001Individual'''
Chaconia Medal Gold Class, 2006

References

External links
 BBC: Dennis Lawrence
 Swansea Player Profile
 Swansea Vital Player Profile
 

1974 births
Living people
Trinidad and Tobago footballers
Association football central defenders
Trinidad and Tobago international footballers
Defence Force F.C. players
Wrexham A.F.C. players
Swansea City A.F.C. players
Crewe Alexandra F.C. players
San Juan Jabloteh F.C. players
TT Pro League players
English Football League players
2005 CONCACAF Gold Cup players
2006 FIFA World Cup players
Recipients of the Chaconia Medal
Wigan Athletic F.C. non-playing staff
Everton F.C. non-playing staff
Coventry City F.C. non-playing staff 
2019 CONCACAF Gold Cup managers
Trinidad and Tobago football managers
Trinidad and Tobago expatriate footballers
Trinidad and Tobago expatriate sportspeople in Wales
Expatriate footballers in Wales
Trinidad and Tobago expatriate sportspeople in England
Expatriate footballers in England